A list of the top 30 most attended IIHF World Championships (out of 85 total). The 2015 tournament, in Prague and Ostrava (Czech Republic), holds the record for overall attendance and the record for average spectators per game. Not included are the Olympic tournaments, which though they are run as an IIHF tournament, have been separate from the World Championships since 1972.

Despite reluctance in some circles to have such a tournament in Olympic years, three of the five most attended World Championships overall have taken place on years that coincided with the holding of a best-on-best tournament, either the Olympics (2010 and 2014) or the World Cup of Hockey (2004).

It should be considered that because of a changing pool-size of teams through the years, the number of games contested at the IIHF World Championships can range from 32 in 1979 to 64 in 2012 and beyond, therefore "attendance per game" is an equally important statistic to measure the success of a given tournament. Ten tournaments have had averages over 9,000 spectators per game, and six have topped the 10,000 mark.

In an effort to broaden the sport's appeal, the number of top division teams was increased from a mere 8 (as late as 1991) to 16 (starting in 1998), leading to an influx of lesser teams that could negatively impact average attendance. To combat this, some organizers have aggressively pushed the sale of day passes that bundle popular games with less sought-after ones.

Finland hosted six of the top 30 most attended tournaments. There are three countries with five of the top 30 most attended tournaments: Czech Republic (including three tournaments held in Czechoslovakia), Russia (including two tournaments held in the Soviet Union) and Sweden. Germany hosted three of the top 30 most attended tournaments, Slovakia – two. There are 7 other countries who have hosted the championships at least once, and are represented on the top 30.

List

† = team won the championship as host

See also
List of IIHF World Championship medalists
Ice Hockey World Championships

References

Attendance
World Championship, IIHF, attendance
Ice hockey statistics
Sports attendance